Cecil del Gue (also known as Cecil du Gué and Cecil du Gue) was a British actor of the silent era. In 1907, he lived in Streatham.

Selected filmography
 The Green Terror (1919)
 Angel Esquire (1919)
 The Fordington Twins (1920)
 The Autumn of Pride (1921)
 Class and No Class (1921)
 Silent Evidence (1922)
 Three to One Against (1923)
 Women and Diamonds (1924)
 We Women (1925)

References

External links

Year of birth unknown
Year of death unknown
British male silent film actors
20th-century British male actors